Réal Charest is a politician in Montreal, Quebec, Canada. He served on the Montreal city council from 1986 to 1994 as a member of the Montreal Citizens' Movement (MCM).

Early life and career
Charest is a life insurance underwriter in private life. He has also served as a caisse populaire administrator, the vice-president of a mental-illness research foundation, and an administrator of a seniors' residence.

He was initially a prominent supporter of Jean Drapeau's Civic Party of Montreal, serving as chief organizer for its candidate in the Marie-Victorin ward for two elections during Drapeau's tenure as mayor. His decision to leave the Civic Party in 1986 and join the MCM came as a surprise to many. Charest has said that Drapeau "didn't say a word for eight to 10 seconds on the phone when I told him," adding, "and that's something, coming from the mayor."

City councillor
Charest was elected for the Marie-Victorin ward in the 1986 municipal election, in which the MCM won a landslide victory. He was re-elected to a second term in the 1990 municipal election, which the MCM also won. During his time on council, he served as a backbench supporter of Jean Doré's administration. He did not seek re-election in 1994.

In 1991, Charest was one of twelve MCM councillors to align with the group Mouvement Québec, which called for a referendum on Quebec sovereignty.

Charest sought to return to council in a 2006 by-election in Marie-Victorin, running as a Vision Montreal candidate. He finished third against Carle Bernier-Genest of the Montreal Island Citizens Union (MICU).

Electoral record

References

Living people
Montreal city councillors
Year of birth missing (living people)